The 2020 European Darts Grand Prix was the third PDC European Tour event on the 2020 PDC Pro Tour. The tournament took place at the Glaspalast, Sindelfingen, Germany from 16–18 October 2020. It featured a field of 48 players and £140,000 in prize money, with £25,000 going to the winner.

Ian White was the defending champion, after defeating Peter Wright 8–7 in the 2019 final. However, he lost 7–6 to José de Sousa in the semi-finals.

De Sousa won his first European Tour title after beating Michael van Gerwen 8–4 in the final.

The tournament was postponed from its original date of 20–22 March 2020 due to the COVID-19 pandemic in Germany.

Prize money
This is how the prize money is divided, with the prize money being unchanged from the 2019 European Tour:

 Seeded players who lose in the second round and Host Nation invitees who lose in the first round do not receive this prize money on any Orders of Merit.

Qualification and format
The top 16 entrants from the PDC ProTour Order of Merit on 4 February automatically qualified for the event and were seeded in the second round.

The remaining 32 places went to players from four qualifying events and to two invitees – 24 from the Tour Card Holder Qualifier (held on 14 February), two from the Associate Member Qualifier (held on 15 October), two from the Host Nation Qualifier (held on 15 October), one from the Nordic & Baltic Associate Member Qualifier (held on 12 October 2019), and one from the East European Associate Member Qualifier (held on 8 February).

The two highest ranked German players on the ProTour Order of Merit as of the 14 February cut-off date also qualified.

Seeded players Peter Wright & Adrian Lewis; and unseeded players Ryan Joyce & Darren Webster all withdrew prior to the draw. The highest ranked qualifiers José de Sousa & Vincent van der Voort became seeds, and the number of places available from the Host Nation Qualifier increased from two to six.

The following players will take part in the tournament:

Top 16
  Michael van Gerwen (runner-up)
  Gerwyn Price (third round)  Ian White (semi-finals)  Krzysztof Ratajski (second round)  Mensur Suljović (semi-finals)  Daryl Gurney (second round)  Dave Chisnall (second round)  James Wade (third round)  Nathan Aspinall (quarter-finals)  Joe Cullen (third round)  Glen Durrant (third round)  Jamie Hughes (third round)  Rob Cross (quarter-finals)  Michael Smith (third round)  José de Sousa (champion)
  Vincent van der Voort (third round)Tour Card Qualifier
  Devon Petersen (second round)  Steve Lennon (second round)  Adam Hunt (second round)  Mervyn King (second round)  Jason Lowe (first round)  Steffen Siepmann (first round)  Jonathan Worsley (first round)  Darius Labanauskas (quarter-finals)  William O'Connor (second round)  Derk Telnekes (second round)  John Henderson (first round)  Maik Kuivenhoven (quarter-finals)  Martijn Kleermaker (third round)  Harry Ward (first round)  Madars Razma (first round)  Scott Waites (second round)  Damon Heta (first round)  Luke Woodhouse (first round)  Chris Dobey (first round)  Kim Huybrechts (second round)Associate Member Qualifier
  David Evans (second round)  Stefan Bellmont (first round)Highest Ranked Germans
  Gabriel Clemens (second round)  Max Hopp (second round)Host Nation Qualifier
  Ricardo Pietreczko (second round)  Michael Unterbuchner (first round)  Markus Buffler (first round)  Kai Gotthardt (first round)  Nico Kurz (second round)  Robert Marijanović (first round)Nordic & Baltic Qualifier
  Mindaugas Barauskas (first round)East European Qualifier
  Pero Ljubić (first round)''

Draw

References 

2020 PDC Pro Tour
2020 PDC European Tour
2020 in German sport
October 2020 sports events in Germany
Sports events postponed due to the COVID-19 pandemic